The Dubai Islamic Bank Tower was a proposed 38-floor tower in Dubai, United Arab Emirates. Construction of the Dubai Islamic Bank Tower started in 2006, but the tower was later cancelled.

See also 
 List of tallest buildings in Dubai

References

External links
Emporis

Proposed skyscrapers in Dubai
Buildings and structures under construction in Dubai